Cotton Tree	 is a village in the	Cayo District of central interior Belize. The village is situated 5km to the northeast of Belmopan along the Western Highway. The surrounding area is agricultural with the most frequent crops being citrus and banana.	It is one of 192 municipalities administrated at the village level in the country for census taking purposes. The village had a population of 1,573	in 2010. This represents roughly 2.4% of the district's total population.	This was a	81.8%	increase	from	865	people recorded in the 2000 census.

References 

Populated places in Cayo District